Kevin P. Sinnette (born March 2, 1962, in Ashland, Kentucky) is an American politician and a Democratic member of the Kentucky House of Representatives representing District 100 since January 2009.

Education
Sinnette earned his BS from Eastern Kentucky University and his JD from Northern Kentucky University's Salmon P. Chase College of Law.

Legislative Elections
2012 Sinnette was unopposed for both the May 22, 2012 Democratic Primary and the November 6, 2012 General election, winning with 11,097 votes.
2008 When District 100 Republican Representative John Vincent left the Legislature and left the seat open, Sinnette won the 2008 Democratic Primary with 3,006 votes (52.2%) and won the November 4, 2008 General election with 10,113 votes (64.4%) against Republican nominee Michael Stewart.
2010 Sinnette was unopposed for the May 18, 2010 Democratic Primary and the November 2, 2010 General election, winning with 6,557 votes (59.7%) against Republican nominee Cheryl Spriggs.

Judiciary
On November 29, 2017, the Kentucky Judicial Nominating Commission, led by Chief Justice John D. Minton, Jr., announced nominees to fill a vacancy in Boyd County Circuit Court. Boyd County is in the 32nd Judicial Circuit and the vacancy was in the circuit's 2nd Division. Sinnette was one of three nominees for the Circuit Court judgeship.

References

External links
Official page at the Kentucky General Assembly
Campaign site

Kevin Sinnette at Ballotpedia
Kevin P. Sinnette at OpenSecrets

1962 births
Living people
Eastern Kentucky University alumni
Kentucky lawyers
Democratic Party members of the Kentucky House of Representatives
People from Ashland, Kentucky
Salmon P. Chase College of Law alumni